Marie Kuunnuaq (December 21, 1933 – March, 1990) was a Canadian Inuit artist.

Born in the vicinity of Mallery Lake, Kuunnuaq later moved to Baker Lake, where she lived with her husband and seven children until her death. She was known for her sculptures and for her appliquéd wall hangings, and her work was featured in many shows across Canada, the United States, and Greenland, including three solo exhibits. The Winnipeg Art Gallery, the Canada Council Art Bank, and the Inuit Cultural Institute are among organizations holding examples of her art.

References

1933 births
1990 deaths
People from Baker Lake
Artists from Nunavut
Canadian women sculptors
Canadian textile artists
Inuit sculptors
Inuit textile artists
Canadian Inuit women
20th-century Canadian sculptors
20th-century Canadian women artists
Women textile artists
Inuit from the Northwest Territories